Thomas Hirschhorn (born 16 May 1957) is a Swiss artist. He lives and works in Paris.

Life and works

From 1978 to 1983, Hirschhorn attended the School of Applied Arts in Zurich, where he was inspired by Beuys and Warhol exhibitions. In the 1980s, Thomas Hirschhorn came to Paris to take part in the 'Grapus'-collective as a graphic designer, because he was impressed by the way their graphic work was politically engaged. Although he and the Grapus people were good friends, working with them wasn't what he wanted to do. He didn't want to work for clients, he wanted to create for himself. In 1991, he decided to leave the world of graphic design in favor of being an artist. During the long years that followed, he developed his own visual research based on the principle of Collage. In the beginning, he claimed these as 'Graphic design from myself,' but was not successful until he decided to position his Collage-work in the field of art and art history.

He then started to create the hyper saturated works he is known for today that incorporate sculpted forms, words and phrases, free-standing or wall mounted collages, and video sequences. He uses common materials such as cardboard, foil, duct tape, magazines, plywood, and plastic wrap. He describes his choice to use everyday materials in his work as "political" and that he only uses materials that are “universal, economic, inclusive, and don’t bear any plus-value”. All of his works are accompanied by written statements that include his observations, motivations and intentions. 

He has said that he is interested in the “hard core of reality”, without illusions, and has displayed a strong commitment to his work and role as an artist. He described working and production as “necessary”, discounting anyone who encourages him to not work hard, and says “I want to be overgiving in my work”. Hirschhorn is also very adamant about not being a political artist, but creates “art in a political way.” 

In 2000, Hirschhorn exhibited Jumbo Spoons and Big Cake at the Art Institute of Chicago to complement the exhibit at The Renaissance Society at the University of Chicago, Flugplatz Welt/World Airport. The 12 Jumbo Spoons are memorials to individuals that he associates with failed utopian ideals. The Big Cake represents excess and violence. World Airport (1999), a clutter of cellophane, tape, partitions, lighting strands, tarmac, televisions, planes, cars, and luggage, represented the artists inability to comprehend the world. 

For his piece Cavemanman (2002), he transformed a gallery space into a cave using wood, cardboard, and tape and put various philosophical and pop culture symbols throughout it.

Gramsci Monument (2013), named after the Italian thinker Antonio Gramsci, was the first project that Hirschhorn built in the United States. It was a site-specific, participatory sculpture at the Forest Houses complex in the Bronx, New York. It was the fourth and final such work in a series he began many years ago dedicated to his favorite philosophers, following a monument dedicated to Baruch Spinoza in Amsterdam in 1999, one to Gilles Deleuze in Avignon, France, in 2000, and a third to Georges Bataille in Kassel, Germany, in 2002. From the beginning, the monuments have been planned and constructed in housing projects occupied mostly by the poor and working class, with their agreement and help.

He presented a lecture as part of the "Image & Text: Writing Off The Page" lecture series through the Visiting Artists Program at the School of the Art Institute of Chicago in Spring, 2006.

Exhibitions
Hirschhorn's work has been the subject of numerous solo exhibitions including the Institute of Contemporary Art, Boston; Centre Georges Pompidou, Paris; Chantal Crousel, Paris; Museu d'Art Contemporani, Barcelona; MAAXI, Museo nazionale delle arti del XXI secolo, Rome; Kunsthaus Zürich; Art Institute of Chicago; Museum Ludwig, Cologne; and Wiener Secession, Vienna. In the summer of 2009, his work Cavemanman was recreated for the exhibition Walking in my Mind at London's Hayward Gallery. Cavemanman was recreated once again in 2022 at the exhibition Dream On by NEON showcasing works from the D.Daskalopoulos Collection Gift at the former Public Tobacco Factory of Athens, Greece.

Collections

Hirschhorn's works are held in collections worldwide, which include the Museum of Modern Art, the Walker Art Center, and the Tate among others.

Recognition
Hirschhorn received the (2000/2001) Marcel Duchamp Prize, the Joseph Beuys Prize in 2004 and the Meret Oppenheim Prize in 2018. 
In June 2011, Hirschhorn represented Switzerland at the Venice Biennale.

Thomas Hirschhorn is represented by Gladstone Gallery, New York; Chantal Crousel, Paris; Stephen Friedman Gallery, London; Alfonso Artiaco, Naples and Dvir Gallery, Tel-Aviv.

Bibliography
Benjamin H. D. Buchloh, Alison M. Gingeras, Carlos Basualdo, Thomas Hirschhorn, Phaidon, London, 2004
Claire Bishop, Hal Foster, Yasmil Raymond, Thomas Hirschhorn: Establishing a Critical Corpus, JRP-Ringier, Zurich, 2011
Lisa Lee, Hal Foster (eds), Critical Laboratory: The Writings of Thomas Hirschhorn, MIT Press, Cambridge, MA, 2013
Anna Dezeuze, Thomas Hirschhorn: Deleuze Monument, Afterall Books, London, 2014

References

External links
 Artist's web-site 
Thomas Hirschhorn at Stephen Friedman Gallery
 2008 Life on Mars, the 2008 Carnegie International 
 2007–08 "Thomas Hirshhorn at Musée d'art contemporain de Montréal" 
 Haidu, Rachel,  "The imaginary space of the wishful other: Thomas Hirschhorn’s Cardboard Utopias." Vector e-zine, January 2006.
 2006 "Someone Cares," in Fillip 
 2001 "Thomas Hirshhorn at Stalingrad Station", Paris, Sculpture magazine 
 Artist's short biography,
 
 TateShots at the Venice Biennale 2011: Thomas Hirschhorn at the Swiss Pavilion The artist talks about his contribution to the Venice Biennale, 2011-06-08
 Thomas Hirschhorn by Museo Cantonale d’Arte Lugano 

1957 births
Living people
Swiss contemporary artists
Zurich University of the Arts alumni